Jefferson may refer to:

Names
 Jefferson (surname)
 Jefferson (given name)

People
* Thomas Jefferson (1743–1826), third president of the United States
 Jefferson (footballer, born 1970), full name Jefferson Tomaz de Souza, Brazilian football midfielder
 Jefferson (footballer, born 1978), full name Jefferson Fredo Rodrigues, Brazilian football midfielder
 Jefferson (footballer, born 1981), full name Jefferson Vieira da Cruz, Brazilian football striker
 Jefferson (footballer, born 1982), full name Jefferson Charles de Souza Pinto, Brazilian football midfielder
 Jefferson (footballer, born 1983), full name Jefferson de Oliveira Galvão, Brazilian football goalkeeper
 Jefferson (footballer, born January 1988), full name Jefferson Andrade Siqueira, Brazilian football striker
 Jefferson (footballer, born July 1988), full name Jefferson Moreira Nascimento, Brazilian football left-back
 Jefferson (footballer, born August 1988), full name Jefferson Lopes Faustino, Brazilian football centre-back
 Jefferson (footballer, born January 1989), full name Jefferson de Souza Leite, Brazilian football midfielder
 Jefferson (footballer, born November 1989), full name Jefferson Tavares da Silva, Brazilian football forward
 Jefferson (footballer, born 1993), full name Jefferson de Jesus Santos, Brazilian football defensive midfielder
 Jefferson (footballer, born 1995), full name Jefferson Reis de Jesus, Brazilian football forward
 Jefferson (footballer, born 1997), full name Jefferson Junio Antonio da Silva, Brazilian football left-back
 Jefferson (singer) or Geoff Turton (born 1944), British singer

Places

Canada 
Jefferson, Alberta

United States 
Jefferson, Alabama
Jefferson, Jefferson County, Arkansas, originally known as Jefferson Springs
Jefferson, Colorado
Jefferson, Georgia
Jefferson, Indiana
Jefferson, Iowa
Jefferson, Kansas
Jeffersontown, Kentucky, originally known as Jefferson
Jefferson, Louisiana
Jefferson, Maine
Jefferson, Maryland
Jefferson, Massachusetts, a village in the town of Holden
Jefferson, Minnesota
Jefferson, New Hampshire
Jefferson, New York, a town
Jefferson (CDP), New York, main hamlet in the town
Jefferson, North Carolina
Jefferson, Ohio
Jefferson, Oklahoma
Jefferson, Oregon
Jefferson, Greene County, Pennsylvania
Jefferson Township, Somerset County, Pennsylvania
Jefferson, York County, Pennsylvania
Jefferson, South Carolina
Jefferson, South Dakota
Jefferson, Texas
Jefferson, West Virginia
Jefferson, Wisconsin, a city in Jefferson County
Jefferson, Green County, Wisconsin, a town
Jefferson, Jefferson County, Wisconsin, a town
Jefferson, Monroe County, Wisconsin, a town
Jefferson, Vernon County, Wisconsin, a town
Jefferson Junction, Wisconsin, an unincorporated community

Proposed U.S. states 
 Jefferson Territory, an unrecognized territory that existed from 1859 to 1861
 Jefferson (proposed Pacific state), proposed in 1941
 Jefferson (proposed Southern state), proposed in 1915

Schools
Jefferson College (Mississippi), a former college and male boarding school, now historic site
Jefferson College (Missouri), a community college in Hillsboro, Missouri
Jefferson College of Health Sciences, a Roanoke, Virginia institution
Jefferson Community and Technical College, a community college in Louisville, Kentucky
Jefferson Community College (Watertown, New York)
Jefferson State Community College, a community college system in Alabama
 Jefferson, brand name of the current Thomas Jefferson University, a university in Philadelphia, Pennsylvania created by a 2017 merger between Philadelphia University and the original Thomas Jefferson University

Other uses 
 Jefferson, Mississippi, a fictional town where many of William Faulkner's stories are set
 The Jeffersons, a 1975–1985 American sitcom
 "The Jeffersons" (South Park), a 2004 episode of South Park
 Jefferson (elm cultivar), a type of tree
 Jefferson (yacht), an American yacht
 Jefferson (Jacksonville Skyway)
 Jefferson Station (SEPTA)
 "Jefferson", a song by Roxette from Room Service
Jefferson Ward or Jeffersons, a discount department store chain operated by Montgomery Ward until 1988
Jefferson method, or D'Hondt method, which are methods of producing proportional representation

See also 
Jefferson Airplane, a 1960s rock band
Jefferson Starship, a band formed in the 1970s from some of Jefferson Airplane's members
Jefferson Avenue Historic District (Ogden, Utah)
Jefferson Barracks Military Post, a former U.S. Army post near Lemay, Missouri
Jefferson City (disambiguation)
Jefferson County (disambiguation)
Jefferson Lines, a transportation service in the United States
Jefferson Literary and Debating Society, a student society at the University of Virginia in the United States
Jefferson Memorial, Washington, D.C.
Jefferson Park (disambiguation)
Jefferson Pools, near Warm Springs, Virginia
Jefferson Prairie Settlement, a former Norwegian settlement in Rock County, Wisconsin
Jefferson River, a tributary of the Missouri River in North America
Jefferson State (disambiguation)
Jefferson Township (disambiguation)
Jeffersonville (disambiguation)
List of peaks named Mount Jefferson, a list of mountains named Jefferson
Rochester Jeffersons, a former National Football league team
Thomas Jefferson (disambiguation)
Thomas Jefferson High School for Science and Technology, Fairfax County, Virginia
Thomas Jefferson National Accelerator Facility, commonly called Jefferson Lab (JLAB)
Washington & Jefferson College, a Pennsylvania liberal arts college
The Jefferson Series, a lecture series in New Albany, Ohio